Pinocchio is a two-episode Italian-British miniseries directed by Alberto Sironi, based on the 1883 novel The Adventures of Pinocchio by Carlo Collodi and filmed in English. It first aired on the Italian channel Rai 1 on November 1 and 2, 2009.

The cast includes Robbie Kay as Pinocchio, Bob Hoskins as Geppetto, Luciana Littizzetto as a female Talking Cricket and Alessandro Gassman as Carlo Collodi. It was shot in Lazio and Tuscany, Italy.

Cast
 Bob Hoskins as Geppetto
 Robbie Kay as Pinocchio
 Luciana Littizzetto (dubbed by Teresa Gallagher) as the Talking Cricket
 Margherita Buy as the teacher
 Violante Placido as The Fairy
 Joss Ackland as Mastro Ciliegia
 Thomas Sangster as Lampwick
 Toni Bertorelli (dubbed by Jimmy Hibbert) as The Fox
 Francesco Pannofino (dubbed by Rupert Degas) as The Cat
 Maurizio Donadoni (dubbed by Tim Bentinck) as Fire-Eater
 Bianca D'Amato (dubbed by Alison Dowling) as Elisa
 Alessandro Gassman (dubbed by Seán Barrett) as Carlo Collodi
 Steven Kynman as Harlequin

References

External links 
 

2008 television films
2008 films
2008 fantasy films
Italian television films
2000s Italian-language films
2000s children's fantasy films
Pinocchio films
Italian fantasy films
Films scored by Jan A. P. Kaczmarek
Television shows based on The Adventures of Pinocchio
2000s English-language films
2000s Italian films